Michal Piter-Bučko (born 28 October 1985) is a Slovak professional footballer who plays as a centre-back for Sandecja Nowy Sącz in the I liga.

Club career
Born in Prešov. A product of hometown 1. FC Tatran Prešov youth system. In July 2012, he joined Polish club Podbeskidzie Bielsko-Biała on a two-year contract.

References

External links
 
 1. FC Tatran Prešov profile

External links

1985 births
Living people
Slovak footballers
Association football defenders
1. FC Tatran Prešov players
Podbeskidzie Bielsko-Biała players
Olimpia Grudziądz players
Sandecja Nowy Sącz players
Slovak Super Liga players
Ekstraklasa players
I liga players
Expatriate footballers in Poland
Slovak expatriate sportspeople in Poland
Sportspeople from Prešov
Slovak expatriate footballers